Zoltán Tildy (18 November 1889 – 3 August 1961), was an influential leader of Hungary, who served as prime minister from 1945 to 1946 and president from 1946 until 1948 in the post-war period before the seizure of power by Soviet-backed communists.

Biography

Early life and family

Zoltán Tildy was born in Losonc (Lučenec now in Slovakia), in the Austro-Hungarian Empire to the family of a Hungarian official in the local government. He took a degree in theology from the Reformed Theological Academy in Pápa, afterwards spending a year studying at Assembly's College, Belfast, in Ireland. Tildy served as an active minister of the Reformed Church beginning in 1921, and edited the daily paper of the Reformed church in Hungary, the Keresztény Család (Christian Family), as well as other periodicals. In 1929, Tildy joined the Independent Smallholders' Party (FKgP) with other noted Hungarian political figures, including Ferenc Nagy. He became executive vice-president of the organization soon afterwards.

He married Erzsébet Gyenis (1896–1985) in 1916 and had three children: Zoltán Tildy, Jr. (1917–1994), Erzsébet Tildy (1918–2012), and László Tildy (1921–1983).

Political career and later life

Tildy was elected to the Hungarian parliament in 1933, being reelected in 1936 and 1939. He put pressure on Horthy's government to pull out of the Second World War. After Hungary was occupied by the Germans, Tildy was forced into hiding. After the Soviets occupied Hungary and drove out the Germans, Tildy became leader of the FKgP. Tildy became Prime Minister of Hungary, serving from 15 November 1945 until 1 February 1946, when Tildy was elected President of Hungary. He was an ex officio member of the High National Council from 7 December 1945 until 2 February 1946.

Tildy served as the first President of the Republic of Hungary until 31 July 1948, when he was forced to resign after allegations emerged about his son-in-law being arrested for corruption and adultery. Tildy was held under house arrest in Budapest until 1 May 1956. He was appointed to the position of a state minister in the coalition government during the 1956 Hungarian Revolution. He was eventually arrested by Soviet forces after the revolution was crushed by Warsaw Pact intervention. On 15 June 1958 Tildy was sentenced by the Supreme Court to six years' imprisonment, in the trial of Imre Nagy and associates. However, he was released under an individual amnesty in April 1959 in view of his advanced years (in fact due to illness). He then lived in complete retirement until he died in Budapest on 3 August 1961.

References

 Föglein Gizella: Az államfő "intézménye" 1944 és 1949 között
 Haas György: A kisgazda államminiszter
 Sulinet

External links
 

1889 births
1961 deaths
People from Lučenec
People from the Kingdom of Hungary
Hungarian Calvinist and Reformed Christians
Hungarian Calvinist and Reformed clergy
Independent Smallholders, Agrarian Workers and Civic Party politicians
Presidents of Hungary
Prime Ministers of Hungary
Members of the National Assembly of Hungary (1945–1947)
Burials at Farkasréti Cemetery
Heads of government who were later imprisoned